Maria Maddalena Rossi (29 September 1906 – 19 September 1995) was an Italian anti-fascist partisan, communist politician, feminist, and journalist. She was a leading voice for leftist women and women's rights in the years following the Second World War.

Biography
Born into wealth, she obtained her degree in chemistry in 1930 at the University of Pavia and found work in Milan. In 1937 she joined the underground Communist Party of Italy where she began military service in the anti-fascist struggle. In 1942, she was arrested by the fascist police in Bergamo and sentenced to confinement in Sant'Angelo in Vado until 25 July 1943. Then she moved to Zurich, where for about a year and a half she continued to work for the party. In December 1944 she returned to Milan and joined the editorial staff of L'Unità, at that time still a clandestine newspaper. In the same year she joined the Press and Propaganda Commission of the High Italian Direction of the PCI.

In 1946 she was elected to the Constituent Assembly of the Italian Republic in the Communist Group. In the Constituent Assembly she fought in particular for the repeal of the article of the pre-Fascist laws that forbade women's access to the highest ranks of the Judiciary. When during the debate over the new Italian constitution Piero Calamandrei argued against the equality of spouses and in favor of affirming the indissolubility of marriage, Rossi fired back that women were now a force in Italian politics and that those women intended to change the entire civil code.

She was also one of the main exponents of the Unione Donne Italiane, of which she would become president from 1947 to 1956. She was then re-elected Member of the I, II and III legislature, always continuing to fight for women's rights. Between 1957 and 1967 she was the vice president of the Women's International Democratic Federation.

References

1906 births
1995 deaths
Italian anti-fascists
Italian feminists
Italian resistance movement members
Italian socialist feminists
Italian Communist Party politicians
Female anti-fascists
20th-century Italian women politicians
20th-century Italian politicians